Macrolenes is a genus of flowering plants belonging to the family Melastomataceae.

Its native range is Indo-China to Western Malesia.

Species
Species:

Macrolenes annulata 
Macrolenes bipulvinata 
Macrolenes bruneiensis 
Macrolenes dimorpha 
Macrolenes echinulata 
Macrolenes esetosa 
Macrolenes glabrata 
Macrolenes hirsuta 
Macrolenes muscosa 
Macrolenes neglecta 
Macrolenes nemorosa 
Macrolenes pachygyna 
Macrolenes rufolanata 
Macrolenes stellulata 
Macrolenes subulata 
Macrolenes tuberculata 
Macrolenes veldkampii

References

Melastomataceae
Melastomataceae genera
Taxa named by Charles Victor Naudin
Taxa described in 1851